Viljo ("Ville") Akseli Heino (1 March 1914 in Iitti – 15 September 1998 in Tampere) was a Finnish athlete who held the world record for the 10,000 metres event from 25 August 1944 to 11 June 1949 and again from 1 September 1949 to 22 October 1949. He was the male Finnish Sportspersonality of the year for 1949.

Born in Iitti, he represented Finland in the 10,000 metres and marathon in the 1948 Summer Olympics in London. He also won the Saint Silvester Road Race in São Paulo in 1949.

References

External links
 

1914 births
1998 deaths
People from Iitti
People from Uusimaa Province (Grand Duchy of Finland)
World record setters in athletics (track and field)
Finnish male long-distance runners
Athletes (track and field) at the 1948 Summer Olympics
Olympic athletes of Finland
European Athletics Championships medalists
Sportspeople from Kymenlaakso